Chaetopterus or the parchment worm or parchment tube worm is a genus of marine polychaete worm that lives in a tube it constructs in sediments or attaches to a rocky or coral reef substrate. The common name arises from the parchment-like appearance of the tubes that house these worms. Parchment tube worms are filter feeders and spend their adult lives in their tubes, unless the tube is damaged or destroyed. They are planktonic in their juvenile forms, as is typical for polychaete annelids. Species include the recently discovered deep water Chaetopterus pugaporcinus and the well-studied Chaetopterus variopedatus.

Housing tubes
The tubes the worms live in are either attached to rocks, or, more commonly, buried in sandy bottoms in shallow waters. The worm has spines along its body segments that are modified for tunneling into the sandy substrate to create the u-shaped tube within which it lives. The tubes are upright u-shaped tunnels lined with mucous, then the parchment tube, with the worm living inside the parchment tube. Each parchment tube ends with a chimney of parchment that juts above the substrate. The tubes can be as long as 85 centimeters and up to 4 centimeters in diameter at the widest portion in the buried central part of the tube. The chimneys may be wider or much narrower than the rest of the tube.

Worm morphology

The worms are unique among the polychaete worms in the highly derived parapodia of the mid-segments of its body that are used in its specialized filter feeding regime. The worm's parapodia are modified into the shape of fans and used to create suction and pump water through the worm's parchment living tube. The morphology of the structures are used in identifying species. The worm feeds by using modified structures on its midbody segments that create mucus nets to trap food passed through the net. A flow of water containing plankton and organic debris is created by "circular flaps" on three segments that create suction that draws water through the living tube.

Bioluminescence
Members of the genus have no organs for detecting light and live their entire adult lives in their buried tubes. In spite of this, known members of the genera exhibit strong bioluminescence. When the worm is disturbed in its home it moves to the end of the tube away from the disturbance and near the disturbance it emits its feeding mucus with crystals that exhibit blue luminescence.

Commensal animals
Two species of filter-feeding crustaceans from different families may make their homes in the Chaetopterus tube, Polyonyx gibbesi (family Porcellanidae) and Pinnixa chaetopterana (family Pinnotheridae) ; while a third species, Tumidotheres maculatus is known to sometimes inhabit the tubes. Polyonyx and Pinnixa are almost always present in the tubes, generally as a pair of crabs, and both species may inhabit the tubes at the same time. However, breeding pairs of either species do not share the tubes with adults of the other species. The crustaceans may live most of their lives in the tubes, leaving in the case of disturbance by exiting through the chimneys at either ends or, when the chimneys are too narrow, by biting through the parchment tube. A nudibranch, Tenellia chaetopterana also lives within the tubes of a species of Chaetopterus. It is hypothesised that this nudibranch feeds on the mucus net which Chaetopterus uses to trap its food or on the faeces of Chaetopterus. Tenellia rolleri is another nudibranch with similar flattened morphology which lives in muddy areas with no obvious food source, but abundant Chaetopterus tubes. It is possible that it lives and feeds in a similar manner.

References

Polychaete genera
Canalipalpata
Bioluminescent annelids
Taxa named by Georges Cuvier